Aploradoherpia is a genus of solenogaster, a kind of shell-less, worm-like mollusk.

Species
 Aploradoherpia insolita Salvini-Plawen, 2004

References

External links
 Salvini-Plawen, L. (2004). Contributions to the morphological diversity and classification of the order Cavibelonia (Mollusca: Solenogastres. Journal of Molluscan Studies. 70: 73-93.

Solenogastres